The 2006 Bulgarian Supercup was the fourth Bulgarian Supercup match, a football match which was contested between the "A" professional football group champion, Levski Sofia, and the winner of Bulgarian Cup, CSKA Sofia. The match was held on 30 July 2006 at the Vasil Levski National Stadium in Sofia, Bulgaria. CSKA beat Levski 3–0 (after penalties) to win their second Bulgarian Supercup.

Match details

2006
PFC CSKA Sofia matches
PFC Levski Sofia matches
Supercup
Bulgarian Supercup 2006